Petrovce may refer to several villages in Slovakia: 

Petrovce (Rimavská Sobota District) - a municipality in the Rimavská Sobota District of southern Slovakia
Petrovce (Sobrance District) - a municipality in the Sobrance District of eastern Slovakia
Petrovce (Vranov nad Topľou District) - a municipality in the Vranov nad Topľou District of eastern Slovakia
Petrovce nad Laborcom - a municipality in the Michalovce District of eastern Slovakia
Granč-Petrovce - a municipality in the Levoča District of eastern Slovakia